Kenneth Reiner (April 2, 1916  September 12, 2011) was an American industrialist, philanthropist and inventor best known for constructing Silvertop, a landmark which is recognized one of the prominent architectural works of John Lautner. He also manufactured hair clips and Kaylock, a self-locking aircraft nut. After the World War II broke out, he invented spring steel Lady Ellen Klippies that subsequently captured 90% of market share. In 1974, he was charged with bankruptcy, leading him to sell Silvertop project.

At an apparent age of 75, he used to take part in singing lessons and later he became a prominent benefactor of Musical Theatre West, a musical theatre of Long Beach. After completing singing lessons, he along with his wife used to hosted musical salons.

Biography 
He was born in Brooklyn, New York, US on April 2, 1916. He lived in Los Angeles by the latter. He received his initial schooling from the Brooklyn Ethical Culture School and graduated from the New York Boys High School in 1933. Later in 1937, he attended Purdue University where he obtained electrical engineering degree. He went to Los Angeles and remained associated with Lockheed Aircraft until he started Kaynar Corp in 1943, a corporation designed to manufacture bolts for the aerospace manufacturer industry.

He also invented heating and cooling systems of low velocity, ceiling lights and light-transmitting electrical skylights. He constructed Midtown School in Los Feliz, Los Angeles. The Silvertop construction was partially completed at $1 million. In 2014, Luke Wood purchased the house for $8.55 million.

Death 
He died in Long Beach, California on September 12, 2011 after a chronic condition.

References

Further reading 
 
 
 

1916 births
2011 deaths
American industrialists
20th-century American inventors
Purdue University College of Engineering alumni